Andrew R. Jassy (born January 13, 1968) is an American business executive who is the president and chief executive officer (CEO) of Amazon. Before being appointed by Jeff Bezos and the Amazon board during the fourth quarter of 2020, Jassy served as the SVP and later as the CEO of AWS from 2003 to 2021.

Early life and education
Jassy is the son of Margery and Everett L. Jassy of Scarsdale, New York. Jewish with Hungarian ancestry, his father was a senior partner in the corporate law firm Dewey Ballantine in New York City, and chairman of the firm's management committee. Jassy grew up in Scarsdale, and attended Scarsdale High School, where he played varsity soccer and tennis.

Jassy graduated cum laude from Harvard College in government, where he was advertising manager of The Harvard Crimson, before earning an MBA from Harvard Business School. In 1989, he wrote in The Crimson that the newspaper should continue to publish advertisements from Eastern Air Lines, despite an ongoing labor dispute there.

Career
Jassy worked for five years after graduation before entering his MBA program as a project manager for a collectibles company, MBI, and then he and an MBI colleague started a company and closed it down.

Jassy joined Amazon as a marketing manager in 1997 with several other Harvard MBA colleagues. In 2003, he and Jeff Bezos came up with the idea to create the cloud computing platform that became known as Amazon Web Services, which launched in 2006. Jassy headed it and its team of 57 people.

In March 2016, Jassy was named Person of the Year by the Financial Times. A month later, Jassy was promoted from senior vice president to chief executive officer of Amazon Web Services. That year Jassy earned $36.6 million.

For his work as chief executive officer of Amazon Web Services, Jassy earned a base compensation of $175,000 in 2020, plus a restricted stock unit award of 4,023 shares (a value of $12,104,844.93 as of July 26, 2020) of Amazon with vesting beginning in 2023. He also received a restricted stock unit award in April 2018 for 10,000 shares (a value of $30,089,100 as of July 26, 2020), which vest 37.5% in 2021, 12.5% in 2022, 37.5% in 2023, and 12.5% in 2024.

In January 2021, Bezos designated Jassy his official successor as CEO; the announcement was made on February 2 during Q4's earnings release. The transition was scheduled for Q3 2021, and on May 26 July 5 was confirmed as the handover date. Jassy assumed the office on the same day as Bezos had founded the company in 1994. During his first year running Amazon, he received a pay package of $212.7 million, a substantial increase from his 2020 compensation.

Personal life
In 1997, Jassy married Elana Rochelle Caplan, a fashion designer for Eddie Bauer and graduate of the Philadelphia College of Textiles and Science, at a Loews Hotel in Santa Monica, California.  Their wedding was officiated by New York Rabbi James Brandt, a cousin of Elana. Both their fathers were senior partners in law firm Dewey Ballantine. Jassy and Caplan have two children.

They live in the Capitol Hill neighborhood of Seattle in a 10,000-square-foot house bought in 2009 for $3.1 million. In October 2020, it was reported that Jassy had bought a $6.7 million 5,500-square-foot house in Santa Monica.

He is chairman of Rainier Prep, a charter school in Seattle.

References

1968 births
20th-century American businesspeople
21st-century American businesspeople
Amazon (company) people
20th-century American Jews
American technology chief executives
Businesspeople from New York (state)
Businesspeople from Seattle
Harvard Business School alumni
Living people
People from Scarsdale, New York
Scarsdale High School alumni
The Harvard Crimson people
American people of Hungarian-Jewish descent
21st-century American Jews
American chief executives of Fortune 500 companies
Seattle Kraken owners